Henri Touzard (2 July 1894 – 22 April 1984) was a French racing cyclist. He rode in seven editions of the Tour de France, from 1923 to 1930.

References

1894 births
1984 deaths
French male cyclists
Place of birth missing